Bbuddah... Hoga Terra Baap is a 2011 Indian Hindi-language action comedy film written and directed by Puri Jagannadh in his second Hindi film after Shart: The Challenge. The film stars Amitabh Bachchan, Hema Malini, Sonu Sood, and Prakash Raj in the lead roles, while Sonal Chauhan, Charmy Kaur, Rajeev Verma, Subbaraju, and Makrand Deshpande play supporting roles, and Raveena Tandon in a guest appearance. The music of the film was composed by Vishal–Shekhar with cinematography by Amol Rathod and editing by S. R. Shekhar. 

The film released on 1 July 2011 to positive response from critics praising Bachchan’s performance & Jagannadh’s dialogues & direction.

Plot
ACP Karan has declared that he will eliminate all gangsters from Mumbai within two months. Gangster Kabir Bhai decides to eliminate Karan instead. In comes Vijju, a hitman who refuses to acknowledge that he is ageing, returns to Mumbai after a long exile in Paris, France, in order to perform one last job. While the gangsters and Vijju try to take down Karan, Karan is trying to woo his old college friend Tanya, and Tanya's friend Amrita is trying to figure out the relationship between Vijju and her mother, as she presumes that they must've had an affair many years ago, due to her mother's overly friendly nature to Vijju. Vijju later reveals that he is not the contract killer and is rather trying to protect his son, ACP Karan. Vijju was a gangster and his rowdyism ultimately leds to him and Sita, his wife get separated and he became separated from his son, Karan and Karan also had no idea about his father as his mother never told him. He also reveals that he didn't have an affair with Amrita's mother. Meanwhile, Vijju meets his estranged wife, Sita, but fails to patch the relationship, while Karan finally succeeds in winning over Tanya and her conservative father. Tedha attempts once again and is successful in pumping some bullets into Karan, failing Vijju's attempts to stop him from going to the place of the shootout. A hurt and angry Vijju then admits Karan to a hospital and visits Kabir's den. After reciting a short story and explaining three morals, Vijju informs that Karan is alive and that the den is surrounded by police, by accusing Tedha of being an undercover officer. A fierce shootout ensues in which Vijju kills all the confused gangsters at the den except Kabir and his aide Mac, who roped in Vijju to the underworld don. Tedha is killed by Kabir, who thinks he was lying. A surprised Kabir realises that Vijju is Karan's father, and that Tedha wasn't an undercover officer. He is shot in the head by Vijju, but Vijju spares Mac. At the hospital, Vijju, finally acknowledging that he is ageing, finally reconciles with his wife and asks her to decide whether he should reveal his identity to Karan. However, she forbids him from doing so, and he decides to go back to Paris, telling his wife Sita to bring Karan along when she is ready to do so.

Cast

 Amitabh Bachchan as Vijay Malhotra "Vijju"
 Hema Malini as Sita Malhotra, Vijju's wife
 Sonu Sood as ACP Karan Malhotra, Vijju's son
 Prakash Raj as Kabir, international Don
 Sonal Chauhan as Tanya Nath Malhotra
 Charmy Kaur as Amrutha
 Rajeev Verma as Mirchi Baba
 Subbaraju as Tedha 
 Makrand Deshpande as Mac
 Vishwajeet Pradhan as Sub-Inspector Shinde
 Shawar Ali as Anju
 Raveena Tandon as Kamini (special appearance)
 Rajeev Mehta as Prem Nath, Taniya's father
 Atul Parchure as Inspector at Airport (cameo)
 Ajaz Khan as Sharp Shooter (cameo)
 Nikhil Pandey as Amrutha's father( cameo)
 Supriya Shukla as Meenakshi, House owner

Production
The director Jagannadh wanted to hire three leading heroines for the movie, which was originally titled Buddah. Finally he zeroed down on Hema Malini, Raveena Tandon and Charmy Kaur, an actress from South India who will be making her Bollywood debut in this movie. Actress Neha Sharma was also interested in doing Kaur's role, but eventually the role went to Kaur. Tandon later said that she signed the movie to work with Bachchan and Jagannadh. For another role in the movie, both Sonal Chauhan and Kangana Ranaut were in discussion, but eventually the role went to Chauhan.

The 'mahurat' shot of the movie was done in March 2011 at Khoja Bungalow in Versova. While Jagannadh broke the coconut, actor Sonu Sood featured in the mahurat shot. The event was also attended by Bachchan, his son Abhishek Bachchan, daughter-in-law Aishwarya Rai Bachchan, and actress Sonal Chauhan.

On 26 April 2011, movie's shooting was disrupted, when Raj Thackeray led Maharashtra Navnirman Sena claimed that there were around 40 foreigners shooting in the movie without proper work permits and visas. MNS filed a police complaint in this regard and later stalled the shooting. Following day, director Jagannadh apologised to the outfit stating that there were indeed few junior foreign artists in the shoot without proper documentation, and assured to be more vigilant in future. Raveena Tandon has also shot for an item song in the film, titled "Main Chandigarh Di Star".

Marketing
The first 60-second promo of the movie was revealed on 20 May 2011 on eight TV channels during IPL match of Mumbai Indians and Rajasthan Royals.

Critical reception
Raja Sen of Rediff gave it four out of five stars and stated, "Bbuddah Hoga Tera Baap is not a particularly well-crafted film, but none of that matters as Amitabh Bachchan makes it work." Behindwoods gave a score of two out of five and said, "If Amitabh is all that matters, watch it." Nikhat Kazmi from the Times of India gave a three and a half stars and stated, "Bbuddah... is a high dose entertainer when the veteran actor never stops amazing you with the range of his histrionics. Despite his age, he grabs eyeballs with his action cuts, his comic cameos, his romantic ditties (with Hema), his libidinous encounters (with Raveena), his emotional bytes, his derring-do, and his over-the top sartorial sense." Critic Taran Adarsh gave a four out of five stars and noted, "On the whole, Bbuddah Hoga Terra Baap is a must-watch for Bachchan fans. Even if you're not a fan of this iconic actor, watch it for a simple reason: They don't make them like Amitabh Bachchan anymore. A masala entertainer all the way. Bachchan is truly the Baap, and this film reiterates this fact yet again. His character, his attitude and the dialogue he delivers will remain etched in your memory for a long, long time. Prakash Raj is super. In fact, it's a treat to watch powerful actors like Bachchan and Prakash Raj embroiled in a confrontation."

Filmfare gave a four star rating and said, "Bbuddah... Hoga Terra Baap is a feast for Amitabh Bachchan buffs. The film ends with a disclaimer saying it's a tribute to the phenomenon, and that says it all." Zee News also gave four stars and stated,"‘Bbuddah Hoga Terra Baap' is a typical Bollywood masala flick with all the ingredients to make it a Box Office hit. An out-an-out Amitabh Bachchan film, 'Bbuddah Hoga Terra Baap' presents Big B in never before seen role, something which reminds you of the exhilarating performance of the iconic star in his earlier films." Sify gave a two and a half star rating and explained, "Big B's presence is so overwhelming he makes the character— a violent, unlikable one—into a somewhat charismatic one. The altercations between Bachchan and the villain (Prakash Raj, fab) are to watch out for, especially towards the end. Also worth savoring are the Amitabh-Hema portions, where they create magic momentarily. It's an average story with archaic storytelling. If you're watching it, keep in mind that Big B is the only thing going for the film." Komal Nahta of Koimoi gave it 2 stars.

Box office
Bbuddah... Hoga Terra Baap was made at a controlled budget of approximately Rs. 100 million. The film had a slow start on the first day but picked up over the weekend with major patronage from family audiences and Amitabh Bachchan fans and declared a super Hit. In the overseas markets, the film collected  from US, UK, UAE and Australia over the opening weekend. Within nearly a week post the release, the film collected  net domestically and another  net overseas. BHTB Recovered all its production cost from theatrical revenues and additional non-theatrical earnings thus ensuring it to be a good profitable venture. The satellite rights fetched the producers approximately

Soundtrack

The music of the film was composed by Vishal–Shekhar, while the lyrics were penned by Anvita Dutt Guptan, Vishal Dadlani and Swanand Kirkire.

Track listing

References

External links
 
 

2010s Hindi-language films
2011 films
2011 action thriller films
Films directed by Puri Jagannadh
Films scored by Vishal–Shekhar
Indian action comedy films
Viacom18 Studios films